"Break Up to Make Up" was a 1973 hit by the Philadelphia soul group the Stylistics. The song was written by Thom Bell, Linda Creed, and Kenneth Gamble.

An R&B ballad, it was the seventh track from their 1972 album Round 2  and was released as a single and reached number 5 on the US Billboard Hot 100 chart. It also climbed to number 5 in the Billboard R&B chart and reached number 34 in the UK Singles Chart in April 1973. The Stylistics' recording sold over one million copies in the US, earning the band a gold disc The award was presented by the RIAA on April 6, 1973. It was the band's fourth gold disc.

Chart performance

References

1973 singles
The Stylistics songs
Songs written by Thom Bell
Songs written by Linda Creed
Songs written by Kenny Gamble
1972 songs
Avco Records singles